Na żywo, ale w studio is the debut studio album by Polish rapcore band Kazik Na Żywo. It was released in April 1994 in Poland through S.P. Records (LP and CC version). The album was recorded in 1992, Łódź ("Celina" and "Spalam się") and January 1994, Warsaw. Song "Artyści" have a lead riff from Kr'shna Brothers track "We know how to kill".

The cover art was created by Jan Staszewski.

Track listing

Personnel
Kazik Staszewski - vocal, lyrics
Adam Burzyński - guitar, backing vocals
Jakub Jabłoński - drums
Michał Kwiatkowski - bass, backing vocals
Krzysztof Banasik, Maciej Lissowski, Rafał Nowakowski, Paweł Srokowski, Sławomir Pietrzak - vocal
Marek Bychawski - trumpet
Paweł Walczak - piano

References

1994 debut albums
Kazik na Żywo albums